The 2009 New York Red Bulls season was the fourteenth season of the team's existence. It began with a 3–0 loss at expansion Seattle Sounders FC on March 19, and ended on October 24 with a 5–0 win over Toronto FC, the last match ever played by the team in Giants Stadium.

Squad

First-team squad

Club

Management

Other information

Competitions

Overall

Major League Soccer

Standings

Results summary

Matches

MLS

U.S. Open Cup qualification

CONCACAF Champions League

References

External links 
2009 Schedule

2009
New York Red Bulls
New York Red Bulls
Red Bulls